Mass graves in Slovenia were created in Slovenia as the result of extrajudicial killings during and after the Second World War. These clandestine mass graves are also known as "concealed mass graves" or "silenced mass graves" because their existence was concealed under the communist regime from 1945 to 1990.

Some of the sites, such as the mass graves in Maribor, include some of the largest mass graves in Europe. Nearly 600 such sites have been registered by the Commission on Concealed Mass Graves in Slovenia, containing the remains of up to 100,000 victims. They have been compared by the Slovenian historian Jože Dežman to the Killing Fields in Cambodia.

Background
Many of the mass graves were created during the war, but the larger sites date from after the war. The wartime graves vary from those of soldiers killed in battle to groups that were targeted by the Partisans due to their ethnicity (e.g., Romani) or other civilians murdered for political reasons.

The postwar graves from the Bleiburg repatriations contain the remains of suspected collaborators, soldiers, and civilians that fled towards Austria in May and June 1945, as well as groups targeted because of their ethnicity (e.g., Gottschee Germans, Hungarians, and Italians). and civilians that were the victims of political purges or marked as "class enemies" to eliminate potential opponents to the new regime.

After the war, the communist authorities denied that the executions had taken place. Attempts to reveal the events were suppressed, evidence was destroyed, and no exhumations took place. People were forbidden from visiting the graves, and many were hidden under waste.

After the collapse of Yugoslavia, researchers in Slovenia started writing about the executions and exhumations were undertaken. However, some left-wing parties, in particular the Social Democrats, have been accused of stalling such investigations.

List of graves
This table includes mass graves and individual graves registered by the Commission on Concealed Mass Graves in Slovenia. Some names are synonyms. The label "soldiers" includes prisoners of war.

See also
 Cerklje ob Krki Airport
 Kočevski Rog massacre
 Mass graves in Celje
 Mass graves in Ljubljana
 Mass graves in Maribor
 St. Ulrich's Church in Dobrunje
 Tezno mass graves

References

 
Aftermath of World War II in Slovenia
Massacres in Slovenia
World War II prisoner of war massacres
Massacres in Yugoslavia
Political repression in Communist Yugoslavia
Yugoslav war crimes
Communist terrorism